The Königshain Hills (Upper Sorbian: Limas) lie in Eastern Upper Lusatia west of the town of Görlitz in the county of the same name. They are located north and south of the village of Königshain after which they are named, and are an extensive, mainly wooded granite region. Their highest points are the Kämpferberge (415m above sea level) and the well-known Hochstein, 406m above sea level. The entire hill range has been a protected area since 1974. In a part (Elysium) of the former  Firsten Quarry there is a bird reserve.

External links 
Königshain Hills
Climbing in the Königshain Hills

Natural regions of Saxony
Hill ranges of Germany
Climbing areas of Germany
Protected areas of Saxony
Quarries in Germany